The Kuomintang (KMT), also known as the Chinese Nationalist Party, is a political party active in the Republic of China (Taiwan) (ROC). It has purportedly been among the world's most wealthiest political parties. In recent years much attention, whether deemed necessary or not, has been paid to the party's businesses and real estate. Claims have been made by party rivals that many of its assets were obtained illegally while the KMT ruled Taiwan under a one-party system. However, in recent years, the party has been hit with many financial and legal difficulties.

The KMT's total assets are said to total nearly NT$40 billion but most of the party's capital was tied in enterprise and real estate, and not as cash.

Kuomintang-owned Enterprises 

Media
Central Daily News
China Daily News

Hospitality 
Palasia Hotel

See also 

 Ill-gotten Party Assets Settlement Committee (CIPAS)
 Period of mobilization for the suppression of Communist rebellion
 Temporary Provisions against the Communist Rebellion
 Martial law in Taiwan
 White Terror in Taiwan
 Transitional Justice Commission (TJC)

References

External links
Asiaweek: The Curse of Black Gold (published in 2000)

Kuomintang
Kuomintang
Assets, KMT